FKP may refer to:

 FKP (company), an Australian property company
 The Casimir Pulaski Foundation, a Polish think tank
 Danish Frogman Corps of the Royal Danish Navy
 Falkland Islands pound, by ISO 4217 currency code
 Federated Parliamentary Club (Poland), a defunct political coalition
 FKP Architects, an American architecture firm
 FK Partizan, a Serbian football club
 FK Pirmasens, a German football club
 Free Conservative Party, a political party of the German Empire